Kochłowice is a district in the south-east of Ruda Śląska, Silesian Voivodeship, southern Poland. It has an area of 17.5 km2 and in 2006 it was inhabited by 12,738 people.

History 

Archaeological excavations in 2007 surfaced traces of a settlement on the territory of Kochłowice existing already in the 9th century. The area became part of the emerging Polish state in the 10th century, and was part of Piast-ruled Poland in the following centuries. The village was first mentioned in 1360 as Kochlowa Lanka. In the 16th and 17th century a salt mill (Salzhütte) operated here, the only such establishment in the Bytom state country. The village was annexed by Prussia in the 18th century, and from 1871 it was also part of Germany. The village was affected by industrial development in the 19th century (coal mines)

After World War I in the Upper Silesia plebiscite 3,364 out of 4,427 voters in Kochłowice voted in favour of rejoining Poland which just regained independence, against 968 opting for staying in Germany. Afterwards it became a part of Silesian Voivodeship, Second Polish Republic. Following the joint German-Soviet invasion of Poland, which started World War II in September 1939, the village was occupied and annexed by Nazi Germany. The Germans established and operated a Polenlager forced labour camp for Poles in Kochłowice (see Nazi crimes against the Polish nation). After the war, the village was restored to Poland.

Kochłowice was merged into Nowy Bytom in 1951, and as part of Nowy Bytom was amalgamated with Ruda to form Ruda Śląska on December 31, 1958.

Notable people 
  (1890–1965), Polish sinologist and translator
  (1910–1986), Polish Catholic bishop, Servant of God
 Henryk Bista (1934–1997), Polish actor
  (born 1957), Polish rock guitarist and music producer
 Wenanty Fuhl (born 1960), retired Polish footballer

Gallery

References

Districts of Ruda Śląska
Archaeological sites in Poland